Salween or Salawin is a river in Burma, Thailand and China

Salween may also refer to:

Places 
 Salween or Salawin National Park in north-west Thailand
 Salawin Wildlife Sanctuary in north-west Thailand
 Salweyn also known as Salwine,  an archaeological site in the northern Sanaag province of Somalia

Other 
 The Battle of the Salween River, a 1718 conflict between Chinese and Mongol forces in Tibet
 Salween (film), a 1994 Thai feature film
 Salweenia, a genus of flowering plants